Luz Solar 2 is the fourth album by Puerto Rican rapper MC Ceja. It was released on September 16, 2008. It features Guelo Star, Polaco, NOTTY or N.O.T.T.Y. and more. It was released on his own Label Get Low Records

Track list 
 Llegó El Cejón (intro)
 Quien Tiene Más Flow
 Running
 Actívate (feat. Guelo Star)
 Dance For Me
 Balas Locas (feat. Polaco & N.O.T.T.Y.)
 What's My Name
 Get Low (feat. Casper & Fen-X)
 Gangsta Love (feat. Mickey Perfecto)
 Sex, Money, Drugs, Guns
 We Ready (feat. Yamo)
 Shalalalalon (Remix)
 Sometimes (feat. Gastam)
 Work Your Body (feat. PJ & Kat)
 Confusión (Remix) (feat. Guelo Star)
 Bomberos

2008 albums
MC Ceja albums